Songa is a Burundian town and colline, seat of the Commune of Songa, in Bururi Province.

Geography
The town is located on a plain in the central-eastern area of its municipality; and is crossed by the national road RN 16 and by the provincial road RP 403. It is 15 km far from Matana, 20 from Bururi and 103 from Bujumbura, the largest city and former capital.

Personalities
Gilbert Tuhabonye (b. 1974), Burundian-American philanthropist and sportsman

References

External links
Satellite map at Maplandia.com
Songa at World Weather Online

Populated places in Bururi Province